One Island East is a skyscraper in Taikoo Place, Quarry Bay, Hong Kong Island, Hong Kong.

Overview
The skyscraper is a commercial office building, rising 298.35 m (979 ft) and has 69 storeys plus two levels of basement. There is a sky lobby on the 37th and 38th floors. In addition, there are 28 high-speed passenger lifts, six high-speed shuttle lifts between Main (G - 1/F) and Sky (37 - 38/F) lobbies, one passenger lift between the main lobby and basement carpark and two service lifts.

One Island East was built under the first use of the Land (Compulsory Sale for Redevelopment) Ordinance (Cap 545), exercised by Swire in 2000. Part of the site was previously occupied by Melbourne Industrial Building (23-floor industrial building demolished 2005) and Aik San Factory Building (22-floor industrial building demolished 2005) which were acquired by the developer in 2002 and 2001 respectively. The main contractor was Gammon Construction.

Tenants
The head office of the Securities and Futures Commission is on the 54th floor.

Swire Properties has its head office on the 64th floor. 

Six Group Hospitality has its  international office located on the 67th floor.

2008 Tropical Storm Kammuri
On 7 August 2008, within two hours of the hoisting of strong wind signal No.8 due to tropical storm Kammuri, some window panes of One Island East were shattered, sending shards of glass across the street and damaging the windows of four flats at Westlands Court. There were no injuries.

Gallery

See also
List of tallest buildings in Hong Kong

References

External links

One Island East Centre on CTBUH Skyscraper Centre
Building's website
 

Skyscraper office buildings in Hong Kong
Quarry Bay
Office buildings completed in 2008